Waterhead is a civil parish in Carlisle district, Cumbria, England.  At the 2011 census it had a population of 130.

The east and south boundaries of the parish are largely formed by the River Irthing. Part of the village of Gilsland lies in the parish, while some of the village is in Northumberland.

A section of Hadrian's Wall, with Birdoswald Roman fort, and the related Hadrian's Wall Path both lie within the parish, near its southern border.

There is a parish council, the lowest tier of local government.

The B6318 road from Langholm to Gilsland passes through the parish.

Listed buildings

 the parish contains eight listed buildings, all at grade II.

References

External links
 Cumbria County History Trust: Waterhead (nb: provisional research only – see Talk page)

Civil parishes in Cumbria
City of Carlisle